The Java Community Process (JCP), established in 1998, is a formalized mechanism that allows interested parties to develop standard technical specifications for Java technology. Anyone can become a JCP Member by filling a form available at the JCP website. JCP membership for organizations and commercial entities requires annual fees – but is free for individuals.

The JCP involves the use of Java Specification Requests (JSRs) – the formal documents that describe proposed specifications and technologies for adding to the Java platform. Formal public reviews of JSRs take place before a JSR becomes final and the JCP Executive Committee votes on it. A final JSR provides a reference implementation that is a free implementation of the technology in source code form and a Technology Compatibility Kit to verify the API specification.

The JCP itself is described by a JSR. , JSR 387 describes the current version (2.11) of the JCP.

List of JSRs

There are hundreds of JSRs. Some of the more visible JSRs include:

Criticism

The JCP's executive board has been characterized as a "rubber stamp organization" since Oracle acquired Sun Microsystems (the original developer of the Java language).  

The Apache Software Foundation resigned its seat on the board in December 2010 because Oracle was unwilling to license the Technology Compatibility Kit for Apache's version of Java.

JCP Program and Industry Awards
Source:

See also

JDK Enhancement Proposal

Notes

External links
Java Community Process home page
List of all JSRs rated final
List of all JSRs